The Decumano or Decumanus Superiore was one of the three main east-west roads (Decumani) in the Ancient Roman city of Naples.

This street is the upper (superiore) and most Northern of the three decumani, or east-west streets, of the grid of the original Greco-Roman city of Neapolis. The central main Decumanus Maggiore is now Via dei Tribunali; while the southernmost or  lower  Decumanus Inferiore is now Spaccanapoli. The three decumani were (and still are) intersected by numerous north-south cross-streets called cardini, together forming the grid of the ancient city.

Buildings 
The Decumanus Superiore is now comprised by via della Sapienza and via dell'Anticaglia, and via Santi Apostoli. Among the buildings and palaces on the road are:
Church of Santa Maria della Sapienza
Palazzo Bonifacio a Regina Coeli
Church of Santa Maria Regina Coeli
Palazzo Pisanelli
Church of Santa Maria di Gerusalemme
Ospedale degli Incurabili
Roman Theater di Neapolis
Palazzo Caracciolo di Avellino
Church of San Giuseppe dei Ruffi
Palazzo arcivescovile
Church of Santa Maria Donnaregina Nuova
Church of Santa Maria Ancillarum
Church of Santi Apostoli
Church of Santa Sofia

The other two decumani are closer to the coast: Decumano Maggiore (Via dei Tribunali) and Decumano Inferiore (Spaccanapoli), also exist in some form or other, mostly as narrow lanes.

Streets in Naples